Joseph Heintz the Younger or Joseph Heintz (II) (1600–1678) was a German painter.

He was born in Augsburg as the son of Joseph Heintz the Elder. In 1625 he travelled to Italy, where he settled in Venice and became known for his copies of his father's work and his religious or mythological paintings.

He died in Venice.

References

1600 births
1678 deaths
Artists from Augsburg
17th-century German painters
German male painters